Dr. Ahmed Shamheed was the Minister of Transport and Communication of the Maldives from February 2012 to November 2012. He is a member of Jumhoory Party (JP) and works as a Director at Villa Shipping and Trade, owned by JP Leader Qasim Ibrahim.  He was also a Director of the Maldives Tourism Development Corporation Board (MTDC).

References

Government ministers of the Maldives
Year of birth missing (living people)
Living people